The 2015–16 season was Dumbarton's fourth consecutive season back in the second tier of Scottish football and their third season in the Scottish Championship, having won promotion from the Scottish Second Division at the end of the 2011–12 season via the play-offs. Ian Murray resigned as manager before the start of the season and moved to Championship rivals St Mirren and was replaced by Stephen Aitken.

Dumbarton finished eighth in the Scottish Championship. They reached the second round in the Challenge Cup before losing to Queens Park, lost in the first round of the League Cup to East Fife and the fifth round of the Scottish Cup to Dundee, following a drawn game.

Results & fixtures

Scottish Championship

Scottish Cup

Scottish Challenge Cup

League Cup

Pre Season Matches

Player statistics

Squad 
Last updated 25 August 2016

|}

Team statistics

League table

Division summary

Transfers

Players in

Players out

Factfile
 The 9 league goals scored in away games matched the record fewest away goals scored set during the 1894–95 season.

See also
List of Dumbarton F.C. seasons

References

Dumbarton F.C. seasons
Scottish football clubs 2015–16 season